Madan Kuh (also Romanized as Maʿdan Kūh) is a village in Pish Khowr Rural District, Pish Khowr District, Famenin County, Hamadan Province, Iran. At the 2006 census, its population was 76, in 23 families.

References 

Populated places in Famenin County